Garra palaniensis is a species of cyprinid fish in the genus Garra endemic to India. It is sometimes placed in the genus Horalabiosa.

References 

Garra
Taxa named by Karunakaran Rema Devi
Fish described in 1994
Taxobox binomials not recognized by IUCN